The Chhaparband are a Hindu caste found in the states of Karnataka and Maharashtra in India.  They are also known as Chhaparbasi, Chhaparwale and Rajput Chhaparband.

Origin

The community claim to be Rajputs from North India who migrated to the Deccan region in search of employment. They were given land in Pune by the Peshwa, around an area that was known as Kala Wawar, which is a black farm in Marathi. This area then became known as the Chhaparband’s lane. The community then took the occupation of building roofs out of the grass and bamboo, and the word Chhaparband literally means a roofer. The community still speak Hindi at home, although the Karnataka Chhaparband also speak Kannada and the Maharashtra Chhaparband also speak Marathi. A section of the Chhaparband have converted to Islam, and formed a distinct community of Muslim Chharband.

They are divided into thirty clans, known as kuls. Every clan has its own origin myth. The main clans are the Baite, Bisen, Chandel, Chauhan, Janakwar, Pasihat, Dalawale Rajput, Paithanwale, Rajput Pardeshi and Sengar. Many of these are famous Rajput clans found in North India. The community is strictly endogamous, and each of the clan is exogamous.

Present circumstances

The Chhapraband no longer practice their traditional occupation. They are mainly a community of small businessmen, although as education spreads, the community is involved in a number of occupation. Despite urbanization, the sense of community identity remains strong, with little intermarriage with other communities or castes. The Chhaparband are Hindu, and have their own clan goddesses. Their customs are similar to other Maharashtra Hindus.

See also

Muslim Chhaparband

References

Social groups of Maharashtra
Indian castes
Social groups of Karnataka